Hilliards may refer to:

 Hilliards, Michigan
 Hilliards, Pennsylvania

See also 
 Hilliard (disambiguation)